The Trickett Wendler, Frank Mongiello, Jordan McLinn, and Matthew Bellina Right to Try Act of 2017, also known as the Right to Try Act, is a United States federal law which allows experimental drugs to be administered to terminally ill patients who have exhausted all approved treatment options and are unable to participate in clinical drug trials. All eligible drugs must have undergone the Food and Drug Administration's (FDA) Phase I (safety) testing. The law seeks to increase access to experimental drugs by allowing patients, through their physicians, to request experimental medicines directly from drug manufacturers without involving the FDA. The FDA's expanded access program exists in parallel to the Right to Try Act. There is no legal obligation for drug manufacturers to provide their investigational products to patient who seek them. 

Acts of the 115th United States Congress
Medical regulation in the United States